The Robert J. Sias senior resident award for excellence in clinical dermatology recognizes the outstanding clinical skills of a graduating resident at the University of Minnesota department of dermatology, and is presented annually at the Resident Graduation Celebration in June. The recipient is chosen by faculty and staff as the resident doctor they would most want to care for family and friends.

See also

 List of medicine awards

References

Medicine awards